South Africa has competed at both the Summer and Winter Paralympic Games.

The country made its Paralympic début at the 1964 Summer Games in Tokyo, Japan, where it sent nine athletes to compete in archery, athletics, swimming and weightlifting. They finished sixth on the medal table with nineteen medals, of which eight gold. Paradoxically, South Africa thus began to compete at the Paralympics just after being barred from competing at the Olympics. South Africa had been banned from the Olympic Games following the passing of United Nations General Assembly Resolution 1761 which, in 1962, condemned the country's policy of apartheid. South Africa was not, however, banned from the Paralympics, and was therefore present at the 1964 Paralympics despite being absent from the 1964 Summer Olympics.

The country continued to compete at the Summer Paralympics until 1976, included.

The States-General (national Parliament) of the Netherlands, the host country of the 1980 Summer Paralympics, adopted a motion declaring South Africa's participation in the 1980 Games "undesirable". South Africa was subsequently absent from the Paralympic Games until 1992, at which point it also made its return to the Olympics, in the context of the dismantling of apartheid. It has competed at the Summer Games ever since.

South Africa made its Winter Paralympics début at the 1998 Games in Nagano, Japan. It thus became the second African country to compete at the Winter Paralympics, following Uganda in 1976. South Africa has competed at every edition of the Winter Paralympics since then. To date, only one athlete, alpine skier Bruce Warner, has represented South Africa at the Winter Games. He has yet to win a medal.

Medal tables

Medals by Summer Games

See also
 South Africa at the Olympics

References